Psilorhynchus amplicephalus is a freshwater ray-finned fish, from the Balishwar river in Assam, India. It can be found in rivers with a stronger current and sandy substrate, it prefers a sandy substrate with the horizontally placed pectoral fin suited to allow the fish to resist the current.

References 

amplicephalus
Taxa named by Muthukumarasamy Arunachalam
Taxa named by Murugan Muralidharan
Taxa named by Paramasivan Sivakumar
Fish described in 2007